Peaceful Peters is a lost 1922 American silent Western film directed by Louis King. The film was distributed by Arrow Film Corporation.

Cast
 William Fairbanks as Peaceful Peters
 Harry Lamont  as Jim Blalock
 W.L. Lynch as Perter Hunter
 Evelyn Nelson as Mary Langdon
 Wilbur McGaugh as 'Sad' Simpson
 Monte Montague as 'Cactus' Collins

References

External links
 

1922 films
1922 Western (genre) films
Lost American films
Lost Western (genre) films
American black-and-white films
Silent American Western (genre) films
Films directed by Louis King
1920s American films